Santo Antônio dos Lopes is a municipality in the central part of the state of Maranhão, Brazil. The population is 14,522 (2020 est.) in an area of 770.92 km².

Population history

References

External links
citybrazil.com.br 

Municipalities in Maranhão